The 2019–20 season was Zvijezda 09's 11th in existence and their 2nd season in the Premier League BH. Besides competing in the Premier League, the team also competed in the National Cup.

In that season, the league ended abruptly on 1 June 2020 due to the COVID-19 pandemic in Bosnia and Herzegovina and by default Zvijezda 09 finished in 12th place, getting relegated back to the First League of RS.

Current squad

Competitions

Pre-season

Premijer Liga BiH

League table

Results summary

Matches

Kup BiH

Round of 32

Round of 16

References

External links
FK Zvijezda 09 at Facebook

FK Zvijezda 09
Zvijezda 09